Rutherglen (from 1983, Glasgow Rutherglen) was a burgh constituency represented in the House of Commons of the Parliament of the United Kingdom from 1918 until 2005. From 2005, most of the area is represented by Rutherglen and Hamilton West, while a small portion is now in Glasgow Central and Glasgow South.

Boundaries

1918–1949:  "The burgh of Rutherglen and the parts of the Lower Ward and Middle Ward County Districts which are contained within the parishes of Carmunnock, Cambuslang, and Blantyre, and the extra-burghal portion of the parish of Rutherglen."

1950–1970: The Large Burgh of Rutherglen, and the eighth district.

1970–1983: The Large Burgh of Rutherglen, and part of the eighth and ninth districts.

Members of Parliament

Elections

Elections in the 1910s

Elections in the 1920s

Elections in the 1930s

Elections in the 1940s

Elections in the 1950s

Elections in the 1960s

Elections in the 1970s

Elections in the 1980s

Elections in the 1990s

Elections in the 2000s

References 

Historic parliamentary constituencies in Scotland (Westminster)
Constituencies of the Parliament of the United Kingdom established in 1918
Constituencies of the Parliament of the United Kingdom disestablished in 2005
Cambuslang
Politics of Glasgow
Rutherglen
Politics of South Lanarkshire